in Latin literally means  or . In common law, it refers to a promise that is not legally enforceable for want of consideration. An example of a nudum pactum would be an offer to sell something without a corresponding offer of value in exchange. While the offer may bind a person morally, since the offer has not been created with any consideration, it is gratuitous and treated as a unilateral contract. The offer is therefore revocable at any time by the offeror before acceptance by the offeree.

It holds that those offers are legally enforceable in a manner similar to option contracts.

See also
Contract
Option contract

Contract law
Latin legal terminology